Susana may refer to:
 Sustainable Sanitation Alliance (SuSanA), a network of organizations active in the field of sustainable sanitation
 Susana (given name), a feminine given name (including a list of people with the name)
Susana (magazine), an Argentine magazine for women
Susana (film), a 1951 Mexican film
Susana (singer), a Dutch trance music vocalist
Susana, a 1992 song by Ricky Martin, a cover version of Suzanne by VOF de Kunst

See also
Santa Susana (disambiguation)
Susanna (disambiguation)